The 2017–18 Bangladesh Football Premier League (also known as SAIF Power Battery Bangladesh Premier League for sponsorship reasons) is the tenth season of the Bangladesh Premier League since its establishment in 2007. A total of 12 teams are competing in the league. Saif Global Sports are the right holder of BPL's tenth edition and they accommodate the advertising, branding, TV transmission, radio, marketing rights of the Bangladesh Premier League 2016–17. The league started from July 28, 2017. Fakirerpool Young Men's Club was promoted as the champion of 2016 BCL season. They were the 13th team to took part in this season, but they did not, due to fund crisis.

Dhaka Abahani are the defending champions, having won their Bangladesh Premier League title the previous season.

Teams

Stadiums and locations
The matches will be held in the two venues.

Personnel and sponsoring

Managerial Changes

Foreign Players

League table

Season Statistics

Goalscorers

Own goals 
† Bold Club indicates winner of the match

Hat-tricks 

4  Player scored 4 goals.

Most Assists

Discipline

Player 

 Most yellow cards: 10
  Malick Mendy (Farashganj SC)

 Most yellow cards: 7
  Sushanto Tripura (Chittagong Abahani)
 Faysal Ahmed (Rahmatganj MFS)
 Enamul Haque Sharif (Dhaka Mohammedan)

 Most yellow cards: 6
  Arif Khan Joy (Brothers Union)
  Mohammed
Uddin Sujon (Farashganj SC)
  Mehedi Hasan Royal (Team BJMC)

 Most red cards: 2
  Arif Khan Joy (Brothers Union)

References

2017–18 in Asian association football leagues
2017 in Bangladeshi football
2018 in Bangladeshi football
Bangladesh Football Premier League seasons